This article is about the demographic features of the population of Algeria, including population density, ethnicity, education level, health of the populace, economic status, religious affiliations and other aspects of the population.

Ninety-one percent of the Algerian population lives along the Mediterranean coast on 12% of the country's total land mass. Forty-five percent of the population is urban, and urbanization continues, despite government efforts to discourage migration to the cities. Currently, 24,182,736 Algerians live in urban areas, and about 1.5 millions nomads live in the Saharan area.

97% of the population follows Sunni Islam; the few non-Sunni Muslims are mainly Ibadis from the Mozabite valley at 1.3% (see Islam in Algeria).

Christianity in Algeria constitutes about 1% of the total population. While significantly greater during the French colonial years, a mostly foreign Roman Catholic community still exists, as do some Protestants. The Jewish community of Algeria, which once constituted 2% of the total population, has substantially decreased due to emigration, mostly to France and Israel.

Algeria's educational system has grown rapidly since 1962; in the last 12 years, attendance has doubled to more than 5 million students. Education is free and compulsory to age 16. Despite government allocation of substantial educational resources, population pressures and a serious shortage of teachers have severely strained the system, as have terrorist attacks against the educational infrastructure during the 1990s. Modest numbers of Algerian students study abroad, primarily in France and French-speaking Canada. In 2000, the government launched a major review of the country's educational system.

Housing and medicine continue to be pressing problems in Algeria. Failing infrastructure and the continued influx of people from rural to urban areas has overtaxed both systems. According to the UNDP, Algeria has one of the world's highest per housing unit occupancy rates for housing, and government officials have publicly stated that the country has an immediate shortfall of 1.5 million housing units.

Population

Vital statistics 

Figures from National Office of Statistics Algeria, United Nations Demographic Yearbook and the CIA World Factbook:

Age distribution

Population Estimates by Sex and Age Group (1.VII.2017):

Population Estimates by Sex and Age Group (Estimates 1.VII.2020):

Life expectancy

Ethnic groups

Arabs make up 73.6% of the population of Algeria, Berbers make up 23.2%, Arabized Berbers make up 3%, and others make up 0.2%. Phoenicians, Romans, Byzantines, Arabs, Turks as well as other ethnic groups have contributed to the ethnic makeup and genetic structure of the Algerian population. Descendants of Andalusian refugees are also present in the population of Algiers and other cities. Moreover, Spanish was spoken by these Aragonese and Castillian Morisco descendants deep into the 18th century, and even Catalan was spoken at the same time by Catalan Morisco descendants in the small town of Grish El-Oued.

The Arab population of Algeria is a result of the inflow of sedentary and nomadic Arab tribes from Arabia since the Muslim conquest of the Maghreb in the 7th century with a major wave in the 11th century. The majority of Algerians identify with an Arab-based identity due to the 20th century Arab nationalism. The ethnic Berbers are divided into many groups with varying languages. The largest of these are the Kabyles, who live in the Kabylia region east of Algiers, the Chaoui of North-East Algeria, the Tuaregs in the southern desert and the Shenwa people of North Algeria.

During the colonial period, there was a large (15% in 1960) European population who became known as Pied-Noirs. They were primarily of French, Spanish and Italian origin. Almost all of this population left during the war of independence or immediately after its end.

Religion

Islam is the predominant religion with 99% of the population. There are about 150,000 Ibadis in the M'zab Valley in the region of Ghardaia.

There were an estimated 10,000 Christians in Algeria in 2008. In a 2009 study the UNO estimated there were 45,000 Catholics and 50,000–100,000 Protestants in Algeria.<ref name=rm>Deeb, Mary Jane. "Religious minorities" Algeria (Country Study). Federal Research Division, Library of Congress; Helen Chapan Metz, ed. December 1993. This article incorporates text from this source, which is in the public domain.</ref> A 2015 study estimates 380,000 Muslims converted to Christianity in Algeria.

Following the Revolution and Algerian independence, all but 6,500 of the country's 140,000 Jews left the country, of whom about 90% moved to France with the Pied-Noirs and 10% moved to Israel.

Languages

Arabic and Berber serve as both official languages and national languages in Algeria.

Algerian Arabic (Algerian Dziriya or Darja) is the language used by the majority of the population. Colloquial Algerian Arabic has many Berber and French loanwords.

Although French has no official status, Algeria is the second-largest Francophone country in the world in terms of speakers, and French is widely used in government, media (newspapers, radio, local television), and both the education system (from primary school onwards) and academia due to Algeria's colonial history. It can be regarded as the de facto co-official language of Algeria. In 2008, 11.2 million Algerians could read and write in French. An Abassa Institute study in April 2000 found that 60% of households could speak and understand French. In recent decades the government has reinforced the study of French and TV programs have reinforced use of the language.

Algeria emerged as a bilingual state after 1962. Colloquial Arabic is spoken by about 83% of the population and Berber by 27.4%.

Spoken and popular languages
 Arabic language: 83% (dialectal Algerian Arabic including all dialects: Eastern, Western, Algiers dialect, Saharan)
 French: 70% (as a 2nd or 3rd language, spoken by both low and highly educated people)
 Berber languages: 27.4% Chaouia, Kabyle, Tamahaq, Chenoua, Mozabite (Tumẓabt)
 English: 15% (as a 3rd language, spoken by highly educated people)
 Korandje language (Kwarandzyey): 0.01%

Official and recognized languages
 Modern Standard Arabic: official language of the state.
 Berber language (Tamazight): official language of the state.

LiteracyDefinition: Age 15 and over can read and write

Total population: 80.2%
Male: 87.2%
Female: 73.1% (2015 est.)

Education expenditures
14% of GDP (2015)

Other demographics statistics
Demographic statistics according to the World Population Review in 2022.
One birth every 33 seconds
One death every 2 minutes
One net migrant every 53 minutes	
Net gain of one person every 43 seconds

The following demographic statistics are from the CIA World Factbook, unless otherwise indicated.

Nationality
Noun: Algerian(s)
Adjective: Algerian

Population
44,178,884 (2022 est.)

Age structure0-14 years: 29.58% (male 6,509,490/female 6,201,450)15-24 years: 13.93% (male 3,063,972/female 2,922,368)25-54 years: 42.91% (male 9,345,997/female 9,091,558)55-64 years: 7.41% (male 1,599,369/female 1,585,233)65 years and over: 6.17% (male 1,252,084/female 1,401,357) (2020 est.)

Religions
Muslim (official; predominantly Sunni) 99%, other (includes Christian, Jewish, Ahmadi Muslims, Shia Muslims, Ibadi  Muslims) <1% (2012 est.)

Population growth rate
 1.34% (2022 est.) Country comparison to the world: 71st
 1.63% (2018 est.) Country comparison to the world: 63rd
 1.7% (2017 est.)

Median age
total: 28.9 years. Country comparison to the world: 139th
male: 28.6 years
female: 29.3 years (2020 est.)

total: 28.3 years. Country comparison to the world: 138th
male: 28 years
female: 28.7 years (2018 est.)

total: 28.1 years
male: 27.8 years
female: 28.4 years (2017 est.)

Total fertility rate
2.51 children born/woman (2022 est.) Country comparison to the world: 68th
2.66 children born/woman (2018 est.) Country comparison to the world: 64th

Birth rate
18.52 births/1,000 population (2022 est.) Country comparison to the world: 78th
21.5 births/1,000 population (2018 est.) Country comparison to the world: 74th

Death rate
4.32 deaths/1,000 population (2022 est.) Country comparison to the world: 207th
4.3 deaths/1,000 population (2018 est.) Country comparison to the world: 205th

Net migration rate

-0.82 migrant(s)/1,000 population (2022 est.) Country comparison to the world: 138th
-0.9 migrant(s)/1,000 population (2017 est.) Country comparison to the world: 135th
-0.28 migrant(s)/1,000 population (2010 est.)
-0.27 migrant(s)/1,000 population (2012 est.)

Urbanization
Urban population: 66% of total population (2010)
Rate of urbanization: 2.5% annual rate of change (2005-10 est.)
Rate of urbanization: 2.3% annual rate of change (2010-15 est.)

Sex ratio
At birth: 1.05 male/female
Under 15 years: 1.04 male/female
15–64 years: 1.02 male/female
65 years and over: 0.86 male/female
Total population: 1.01 male/female (2012 est.)

Infant mortality rate
Total: 27.73 deaths/1,000 live births
Male: 30.86 deaths/1,000 live births
Female: 24.45 deaths/1,000 live births (2009 est.)

Total: 24.9 deaths/1,000 live births
Male: 27.82 deaths/1,000 live births
Female: 21.83 deaths/1,000 live births (2012 est.)

Life expectancy at birth
total population: 78.03 years Country comparison to the world: 77th
male: 76.57 years
female: 79.57 years (2022 est.)

Total population: 77 years
Male: 75.6 years
Female: 78.4 years (2017 est.)

Urbanization
urban population: 74.8% of total population (2022)
rate of urbanization: 1.99% annual rate of change (2020-25 est.)

HIV/AIDS
Adult prevalence rate: 0.1% ; note - no country specific models provided (2001 est.)
People living with HIV/AIDS: 21,000 (2007 est.)
Deaths: less than 1000 (2007 est.)

Obesity rate
Adult prevalence rate: 27.4% (2016 est.)

Major infectious diseases
Degree of risk: intermediate
Food or waterborne diseases: bacterial diarrhea, hepatitis A, and typhoid fever
Vector borne disease: cutaneous leishmaniasis is a high risk in some locations (2005)

 Genetics 

 Y-DNA frequencies in coastal Algeria 

In a recent genetic study by Semino et al. (2004), the Haplogroup J1 associated with the diffusion of Arabs was found at 35% in Algeria,Semino et al. (2004), Origin, Diffusion, and Differentiation of Y-Chromosome Haplogroups E and J  which is one of the most common haplogroups in Algeria, like the rest of the Maghreb, along with E1b1b.

Recent studies on the common J1 Y chromosome suggest it arrived over ten thousand years ago in North Africa, and M81/E3b2 is a Y chromosome specific to North African ancestry, dating to the Neolithic. A thorough study by Arredi et al. (2004) which analyzed populations from Algeria concludes that the North African pattern of Y-chromosomal variation (including both E3b2 and J haplogroups is largely of Neolithic origin, which suggests that the Neolithic transition in this part of the world was accompanied by demic diffusion of Afro-Asiatic–speaking pastoralists from the Middle East. This Neolithic origin was later confirmed by Myles et al. (2005) which suggest that "contemporary Berber populations possess the genetic signature of a past migration of pastoralists from the Middle East",

References

External links

 (ONS.dz) Official Demographics Statistics of Algeria
 Population cartogram of Algeria
 Unexpected developments in Maghrebian fertilityand the  U.S. Department of State website.''
 Laouisset, Djamel (2009). A Retrospective Study of the Algerian Iron and Steel Industry. New York City: Nova Publishers. .